The 2011 Skybet World Matchplay was the 18th annual staging of the World Matchplay, organised by the Professional Darts Corporation. The tournament took place from 16–24 July 2011. It was sponsored by Skybet (who had previously sponsored the UK Open and the World Grand Prix) who took over from Stan James after 10 years.

Phil Taylor successfully defended his title, defeating James Wade 18–8 in the final to win his twelfth World Matchplay crown and his fourth in successive years.

In the quarter-final, Andy Hamilton produced a remarkable comeback. Trailing 8–15 to Simon Whitlock and only one leg from defeat, Hamilton won nine consecutive legs to advance to the semi-finals.

John Part recorded his first and only televised nine-dart finish, and the third in Matchplay history, in his first-round defeat to Mark Webster.

The 2011 World Matchplay is notable for being the last darts tournament on Sky Sports where long-time commentator, Sid Waddell, commentated full-time. He was diagnosed with bowel cancer in September 2011, underwent treatment, and made a brief return to the commentary box during the 2012 Premier League Darts. Waddell died from the bowel cancer on the 11 August 2012, the day after his 72nd birthday.

Prize money
For the third consecutive World Matchplay, the prize fund was £400,000.

Qualification
The top 16 in the PDC Order of Merit qualified automatically and were also seeded players. The other 16 places went to the top 16 non-qualified players from the Players Championships Order of Merit.

These were the participants:

PDC Top 16
  Phil Taylor (winner)
  Adrian Lewis (semi-finals)
  James Wade (runner-up)
  Gary Anderson (first round)
  Simon Whitlock (quarter-finals)
  Raymond van Barneveld (quarter-finals)
  Terry Jenkins (first round)
  Wes Newton (quarter-finals)
  Mervyn King (first round)
  Mark Webster (quarter-finals)
  Paul Nicholson (second round)
  Ronnie Baxter (first round)
  Colin Lloyd (first round)
  Mark Walsh (second round)
  Vincent van der Voort (second round)
  Wayne Jones (second round)

PDPA Players Championship qualifiers
  John Part (first round)
  Andy Smith (first round)
  Jamie Caven (first round)
  Justin Pipe (second round)
  Dave Chisnall (first round)
  Peter Wright (first round)
  Alan Tabern (first round)
  Mark Hylton (first round)
  Steve Brown (first round)
  Denis Ovens (second round)
  John Henderson (second round)
  Kevin Painter (first round)
  Scott Rand (first round)
  Colin Osborne (first round)
  Steve Beaton (second round)
  Andy Hamilton (semi-finals)

Draw

Scores after player's names are three-dart averages (total points scored divided by darts thrown and multiplied by 3)

Statistics

Broadcasters
In the United Kingdom and Ireland, the tournament was broadcast by Sky Sports for the 18th consecutive time.
In the Netherlands, RTL7 broadcast the tournament for the very first time through an internet livestream, and in highlights on Friday, Saturday and Sunday on television.
The tournament was broadcast in Australia for the first time with Fox Sports.

References

World Matchplay (darts)
World Matchplay Darts
World Matchplay Darts